The 1975–76 FC Bayern Munich season was the club's 11th season in Bundesliga.

Review and events
In Glasgow, the club defeated AS Saint-Étienne to win the 1976 European Cup Final, with Roth scoring the winning goal. Bayern became the third club to win the trophy in three consecutive years. However, Bayern was unsuccessful in domestic competitions and was also defeated in the 1975 European Super Cup by FC Dynamo Kyiv.

Match results

Legend

Bundesliga

DFB-Pokal

European Cup

European Super Cup

References

FC Bayern Munich seasons
Bayern
UEFA Champions League-winning seasons